Loss of heterogeneity (not to be confused with loss of heterozygosity) may be a disappearance of heterogeneity of
 Ion channels - see Heterogeneity#Biology
 Genetic variation in a species - see Ecological extinction